Central was a Singaporean English and Tamil language free-to-air television channel. Its programming schedule was composed of three timeshared channels on its frequency slot: Kids Central, Vasantham Central and Arts Central.

Previously, Indian-related programming was broadcast along with Malay-language programmes on Prime 12, while Premiere 12's schedule consisted of arts, documentaries and kids shows.

MediaCorp Central was closed down on 19 October 2008 when Vasantham Central relaunched as the standalone channel Vasantham. Arts Central and Kids Central were merged into a single channel named okto, with kids and arts programming.

History
Singapore Television Twelve split the former Channel 12 on 1 September 1995, with the existing channel being replaced by Prime 12, including Tamil-language programming on its schedule. Premiere 12 was launched to include children's TV series (mainly for a preschooler audience) and sports coverage.

At the end of 1999, Singapore Television Twelve announced that Premiere 12 was going to be replaced by Central as part of a company-wide restructuring of MediaCorp's television output, with the launch set for January 30, 2000.

Central's programming schedule was composed of three timeshared channels: Kids Central, focused on kids' programming; Vasantham Central, a Tamil-language programming block; and Arts Central centred on cultural programming. On launch week, Kids Central reportedly had 70,000 to 173,000 viewers, Vasantham Central exceeded 30% share and the showing of the Cirque du Soleil performance Quidam on Arts Central attracted 140,000 viewers. On 28 February 2000, Singapore Television Twelve increased Central's on-air hours from 91½ to 110½ hours per week.

On 19 October 2008, Central was dissolved. Vasantham Central on-air time was extended to form Vasantham, an independent channel focused on the Indian community of Singapore, as announced on 29 February that year by then Senior Minister of State for Information, Communications and the Arts Dr. Balaji Sadasivan in Parliament. Meanwhile, Kids Central and Arts Central were merged into a single channel named Okto, which took Channel i's frequency and channel space.

Timeshared channels

Kids Central 
Kids Central was Singapore's most-watched children's channel. Its programmes aim to bring fun television entertainment to children aged 4 to 12 years, as well as appeal to people's inner children. The channel was set up to be a strong terrestrial alternative to cable channels and programming blocks aimed at children.

Vasantham Central 

Vasantham Central was focused to the Tamil community of Singapore, broadcasting Indian-produced dramas, variety, news, information, and entertainment shows in Tamil language. The station offered hours of programming on weekdays and on weekends, with approximately a quarter of local content.

The Children's Day Telemovie Special Matchstick was awarded the Certificate of Distinction at the New York Festivals in 2004. The channel conducted acting workshops, training and events such as Mother's Day celebrations in Tekka Mall.

Arts Central

Arts Central consisted on cultural-focused programming, with magazine shows, in-depth documentaries, performances, art-house movies, adult animation and short films. Arts Central offered 20 hours of programming per week.

In 2001, both Hanging by the Thread and AlterAsian received a Finalist status at the New York Festival, and in 2007, the I-Collector series placed as runners-up in the Asian TV Awards.

See also
 Channel U
 Suria
 Okto
 Vasantham
 Channel i
 MediaCorp TV12
 TVMobile

References

2000 establishments in Singapore
2008 disestablishments in Singapore
Television stations in Singapore
Mass media in Singapore
Mediacorp
Television channels and stations established in 2000
Television channels and stations disestablished in 2008